Kim So-hyun (born November 12, 1975) is a South Korean musical theatre actress. A classically-trained former opera singer, she switched to musical theater and debuted in 2001 as Christine Daaé in The Phantom of the Opera. She immediately rose to musical theatre stardom and has since starred in South Korean stage productions of Jekyll & Hyde, My Fair Lady, The Three Musketeers, Elisabeth, and Marie Antoinette.

Early life and education
Kim is the oldest of three children. The children grew up in a musical household as their mother, mezzo-soprano Jang Kyung-ae, was a former opera singer who gave up a promising career to raise her children. In contrast to many of her peers, Kim did not attend a performing arts high school and has stated in a 2013 interview that she had started out playing the violin and actually shunned singing. She injured her wrist in middle school and decided to try singing after listening to a recording of La bohème. 

In 1994, Kim was admitted to Seoul National University's College of Music, majoring in voice. She graduated with her bachelor's degree in 1998. In 2012, shortly after the birth of her son, she completed her master's degree.

Career

Opera beginnings
Initially Kim intended to pursue a career in opera, following in her mother's footsteps. She participated in various vocal competitions, placing in the top three or reaching the semi-finals in all of them. Prior to switching to musical theater, she made her Seoul Arts Center debut, starring in La bohème (as Mimi) and The Magic Flute (as Pamina).

Musical theater and television
In 2001, then a graduate student, Kim was given the opportunity to try musical theater despite having no experience outside of opera and classical music. She successfully auditioned for the role of Christine Daaé in the Korean-language production of The Phantom of the Opera. Musical theater had only been recently introduced into South Korea, spurred by the advent of Korean-language versions of popular musicals, with The Phantom of the Opera being one of the most famous and well-attended productions. Up until then, Kim had rarely sung in Korean as she had mostly been performing opera repertoire from the Western classical tradition. She has come to be associated with the role, having portrayed Christine Daaé in the 2009 run of The Phantom of the Opera and two productions of Phantom.

When Kim first entered musical theater, classically-trained singers were uncommon as singers with her training often preferred to pursue careers as opera singers in Europe while most musical actors were primarily trained in acting rather than singing. Her powerful bel canto voice subsequently led to her being cast as female protagonists, particularly royalty; she has portrayed Empress Elisabeth of Austria in Elisabeth, Empress Myeongseong in The Last Empress and Marie Antoinette in Marie Antoinette to critical acclaim. In 2008, she won her first acting award, being named Best Actress at the Korean Musical Awards that year for her role as Eliza in My Fair Lady. 

Kim gained wider public recognition through her appearances on variety shows and televised music programs. Together with her husband, the couple have performed together multiple times on Open Concert and Immortal Songs: Singing the Legend.

Personal life
Kim married musical actor Son Jun-ho in 2011 and they have a son (born in 2012). They first met in the 2009 production of The Phantom of the Opera as he was cast as Raoul. As working musical actors, they largely avoid starring as a married couple in the same production but made a rare exception for The Last Empress and Elisabeth.

Credits

Opera

Musical theater

Filmography

Television series

Television shows

Web shows

Awards

Vocal competitions
1995: Schubert Competition – consolation prize (semi-finalist)
1996: JoongAng Music Concours – 3rd place
1997 Korea Youth Vocal Competition (college division) – 1st place

Musical theater

References

External links
  n

1975 births
Living people
South Korean musical theatre actresses
South Korean operatic sopranos
South Korean television actresses
21st-century South Korean actresses
21st-century South Korean women singers
Seoul National University alumni